Margaret Neville Catt Bridson Cribb  (4 August 1924 – 12 August 1993) was a lecturer in government and political science at the University of Queensland.

Early life 
Margaret Neville Catt was born in 1924. She was the only child of Mr and Mrs E. Neville Catt of Rockhampton. She attended Brisbane Girls Grammar School from 1938–1941. Margaret enrolled at the University of Queensland in 1944, residing at the Women's College. She became active in the Student Union, was the first female editor of the Union magazine, Semper Floreat in 1946, and Vice President of the Student Union. She was also President of the Women’s Students Club.

Cribb married Ivor Cribb, who had been President of the Student Union in 1947. The Cribbs moved to Southport in 1948 where Ivor taught at the Southport School.

Career 
Margaret Cribb returned to the University of Queensland to undertake her Honours degree in 1966, working as a tutor in the Government Department of the University of Queensland in 1965. She eventually rose to Reader. She took her M.A in 1972. She held the honorary title of Associate Professor when she retired in 1987.

Cribb became an Honorary Fellow of the University of Queensland Women's College in 1992, after serving on the Council from 1973–1985, and was President on two occasions. She published two books about the labour union movement in Queensland including the Politics of Queensland (1977) with Denis Murphy and Premiers of Queensland (1990).

Cribb was recognised for her services to education and women's affairs in 1992, becoming a Member of the Order of Australia.

Cribb died of meningitis in Brisbane in 1993. She was survived by her husband Ivor and their two children.

Legacy 
The Margaret Cribb Child Care Centre at the University of Queensland is named for her. In 1995 the Margaret Cribb Memorial Prize was established at the same university.

References

1924 births
1993 deaths
Australian political scientists
Members of the Order of Australia
University of Queensland alumni
Academic staff of the University of Queensland
Australian women academics
Women political scientists
20th-century political scientists